The 1981 National League Division Series (NLDS), the opening round of the 1981 National League playoffs which began on Tuesday, October 6, and ended on Sunday, October 11. The Division Series was created on August 6 in response to the 1981 Major League Baseball strike, which caused the cancellation of roughly one-third of the regular season between June 12 and August 9; by the time play was resumed, it was decided that the best approach was to have the first-half leaders automatically qualify for postseason play, and allow all the teams to begin the second half with a clean slate. The series were best-of-five games.

The Montreal Expos defeated the Philadelphia Phillies while the Los Angeles Dodgers defeated the Houston Astros to advance to the National League Championship Series.

Overview 
The first half and second-half champions in both the National League East and National League West divisions would meet in best-of-five series, with the winners advancing to the NL Championship Series (NLCS). If the same team won both halves, a wild card team – the second-place team from both halves combined – would qualify for the postseason, but this proved unnecessary in both leagues. There were no plans to continue the format in later seasons, although the Division Series resumed in  after MLB realigned to three divisions in each league. The teams in the 1981 NLDS were:

East Division: Philadelphia Phillies (first-half champion, 34–21) vs. Montreal Expos (second-half champion, 30–23): Expos win series, 3–2.
West Division: Los Angeles Dodgers (first-half champion, 36–21) vs. Houston Astros (second-half champion, 33–20): Dodgers win series, 3–2.

The second-half champions played the first two games at home, with the first-half champions hosting all remaining games; this was predetermined in August, independent of team records. Had a team won both halves of the season, they would have hosted all games of the series other than the first game, which the wild card team would host.

The results of the format were highly controversial, as the Cincinnati Reds failed to qualify for the postseason despite having the best record in baseball (66–42) over the full season; the St. Louis Cardinals, with the NL's second-best record (59–43), were also left out. The Reds had finished the first half of the season just a half-game behind the Dodgers, while the Cardinals finished the second half just a half-game behind the Expos, who were making their first postseason appearance after 13 years of play.

Both series went the full five games. The home team won every game in both series save for one: Game 5 of the East Division series, which Montreal won 3–0 at Philadelphia's Veterans Stadium. The Dodgers and Expos went on to meet in the NL Championship Series. The Dodgers became the National League champion, and defeated the American League champion New York Yankees in the 1981 World Series.

Matchups

Los Angeles Dodgers vs. Houston Astros

Philadelphia Phillies vs. Montreal Expos

Los Angeles vs. Houston

Game 1

Fernando Valenzuela faced Nolan Ryan, a matchup worthy of a pitcher's duel. The game remained scoreless until the bottom of the sixth. Tony Scott singled home Terry Puhl to score the game's first run, but Steve Garvey tied the game with a home run in the top of the seventh. The game would remain 1–1 into the bottom of the ninth. Dave Stewart retired the first two men, but Craig Reynolds singled and Alan Ashby slugged a two-run walk-off home run. It was the first postseason walkoff home run in Astros history.

Game 2

Jerry Reuss was pitted against Joe Niekro. Both pitchers kept the game scoreless, but both teams had trouble scoring runs when they managed to get men on. Reuss pitched nine innings and Niekro eight. It remained scoreless until the bottom of the 11th. Dave Stewart was brought in once again, although having lost the last game. He surrendered back-to-back singles to open the inning. He was taken out and the bases were loaded thanks to an intentional walk to César Cedeño. The bullpen had managed to get two outs but pinch hitter Denny Walling hit the game winner, a single to right field.

Game 3

Houston was now one win away from winning their first ever postseason series and moving one step closer to the franchise's first pennant. However, Burt Hooton was there to stop the streaking Astros against Bob Knepper. Hooton held the Astros to three hits over seven innings and the bullpen held them to no hits through the last two innings. After an RBI double by Dusty Baker, Steve Garvey hit a two-run homer to make it 3–0 in the bottom of the first. Art Howe would drive the only run of the game for the Astros by hitting a leadoff home run in the third. The Dodgers would add insurance in the eighth. With two on and one out off of Joe Sambito, Bill Russell's RBI single, Reggie Smith's sacrifice fly, and Ken Landreaux's RBI single extended their lead to 6–1. Bob Welch pitched a scoreless ninth to keep the Dodgers in the series.

Game 4

Fernando Valenzuela took the hill for the Dodgers once again, this time against Vern Ruhle. Both pitchers pitched complete games for their respective teams. Eventual World Series co-MVP Pedro Guerrero got the Dodgers on the board first with a homer in the bottom of the fifth. Bill Russell drove in the eventual winning run in the bottom of the seventh with an RBI single. A two-out RBI single in the ninth produced the only Astros run as the Dodgers won Game 4, 2–1.

Game 5

Nolan Ryan was brought in on clinching day to win the Astros their first ever postseason series. Opposing him would be Jerry Reuss, who had pitched so well in Game 2. Thanks to a few walks and an error, the Dodgers struck for three runs in the bottom of the sixth. A two-out triple by Steve Garvey made it 4–0 Dodgers in the seventh. In the end, Reuss went the distance again and pitched a brilliant five-hit shutout to put the Dodgers in the 1981 National League Championship Series. In addition, the Dodgers avenged their loss to the Astros the previous year in a one-game playoff for the NL West title.

Composite box
1981 NLDS (3–2): Los Angeles Dodgers over Houston Astros

Philadelphia vs. Montreal

Game 1

In the other division series, the first ever MLB postseason game in Canada featured the Expos, participating for the first time in post-season play (they would not make the playoffs again until  31 years later, as the Washington Nationals), would have to defeat the defending World Champions, the Philadelphia Phillies. Steve Rogers faced Steve Carlton in Game 1 in Montreal, the first-ever MLB postseason game played outside the United States. A Gary Carter double scored the first Expo run in postseason history in the first. But the Phillies wasted no time in responding. Keith Moreland homered to lead off the second. The game was tied at one. A Chris Speier double gave the Expos the lead for good. Warren Cromartie would double in the third and final Expo run of the game. The score would remain the same. Rogers pitched  innings and gave up ten hits, but only one run was allowed. Jeff Reardon got the final out and the save. This was the Expos' first postseason victory.

Game 2

Dick Ruthven was called on to stem the tide against Bill Gullickson. Chris Speier's RBI single in the second made it 1–0 Expos. Then a two-run homer in the third by Gary Carter made it 3–0. Gullickson was masterful, allowing only one run (on Pete Rose's RBI single in the eighth after a two-out double by Lonnie Smith) and six hits in  innings. Jeff Reardon got the save for the second consecutive game.

Game 3

Ray Burris was called on in the potential clincher against Larry Christenson, hoping to keep the Phillies alive. In the second, Chris Speier's amazing postseason continued with another RBI single to give the Expos the lead. However, Manny Trillo's two-run single in the bottom of the second gave the Phillies the lead. Two more RBI singles made it 4–1 in the sixth. Two more runs for the Phillies in the seventh gave them six for the night. The Expos would get another on a sacrifice fly in the seventh but the score would remain 6–2 as the Phillies won.

Game 4

Arguably the best game of the series took place in Game 4. Scott Sanderson started against Dickie Noles. The Phillies jumped out to a 2–0 lead in the first on a two-run homer by Mike Schmidt. Keith Moreland's two-run single made it 4–0 in the third. But the Expos refused to go quietly. Gary Carter homered to lead off the fourth to make it 4–1. A Jerry White sacrifice fly made it 4–2 in the fifth. The Expos would tie the game thanks to Chris Speier's RBI single and he would later score. Gary Matthews would homer to give the Phillies the lead. Gary Carter would double to tie the game again in the seventh. In the bottom of the tenth, George Vukovich would walk the game off with a leadoff homer off Jeff Reardon. It tied the series at two games apiece and set up the deciding Game 5.

Game 5

In Game 5, the defending Champions sent their best, Steve Carlton, to the mound. Carlton would once again face Steve Rogers. Carlton was hoping to avenge his Game 1 loss. Both pitchers kept the game scoreless into the fifth inning. A single and two walks loaded the bases for Rogers. In what proved to be the series winning hit, Rogers singled to center, scoring Larry Parrish and Chris Speier. An RBI double by Parrish in the sixth made it 3–0. That would be all Rogers would need. He allowed only six hits and one walk in a complete game shutout of the defending World Champions. His brilliance led the Expos to the NLCS and their first ever postseason series win. The Expos franchise would not advance in the postseason for another 38 years, until a win in the 2019 National League Wild Card Game as the Washington Nationals. They would not win another postseason series until the 2019 NLDS.

Composite box
1981 NLDS (3–2): Montreal Expos over Philadelphia Phillies

References

Further reading

External links
LAD vs. HOU at Baseball-Reference
MON vs. PHI at Baseball-Reference

National League Division Series
National League Division Series
Los Angeles Dodgers postseason
Montreal Expos postseason
Philadelphia Phillies postseason
Houston Astros postseason
1980s in Montreal
National League Division Series
1981 in sports in California
1981 in sports in Pennsylvania
1981 in sports in Texas
National League Division Series
National League Division Series
1980s in Philadelphia
National League Division Series
National League Division Series
National League Division Series